Eugene Francis "Buddy" Teevens III (born October 1, 1956) is an American football coach and former player.  He is the head football coach at Dartmouth College, a position he held from 1987 to 1991 and resumed in 2005. Teevens also served as the head football coach at the University of Maine (1985–1986), Tulane University (1992–1996), and Stanford University (2002–2004).

Early life
Born in Pembroke, Massachusetts, Teevens attended Silver Lake Regional High School in Kingston, Massachusetts and Deerfield Academy. He attended college at Dartmouth, and played quarterback there from 1975 to 1978.  He was the quarterback of the Big Green team that won the Ivy League football title in 1978. He was an honorable mention All-America that same year.

Teevens also played hockey while at Dartmouth; in Teevens' senior year, the hockey team finished third in the NCAA Men's Ice Hockey Championship. He graduated from Dartmouth in 1979 with an A.B. in history. Teevens was also selected to be a member of the Sphinx Senior Society at Dartmouth.

Coaching career

Early positions
Teevens' first coaching job was as running backs coach at DePauw University from 1979 to 1980. He was then offensive coordinator at Boston University from 1981 to 1984.

From 1985 to 1986, he was the head coach at the University of Maine. He had an overall record of 13–9 there.

Dartmouth
Teevens' first stint with the Big Green, from 1987 to 1991, showed an upward trend. Beginning with a 2–8 record, Dartmouth then had successive years of 5–5 and 7–2–1. In 1990 and 1991, Dartmouth won the Ivy League championship.

Tulane
After his first head coaching job at Dartmouth, Teevens was the coach at Tulane University from 1992 to 1996. While he had an overall record of 11–45 in five years at Tulane, he recruited many of the players on the 1998 team that went 12-0.

Return to assistant coaching
Between 1997 and 1998, Teevens was the offensive coordinator and wide receiver coach at the University of Illinois at Urbana-Champaign for head coach Ron Turner.

In 1999, Teevens was the running backs coach at the University of Florida. The next year, he coached the passing game, wide receivers, tight ends, placekickers, long snappers, and holders. He coached tight ends in 2001 along with being the assistant offensive coordinator. In his three years at Florida, he coached under Steve Spurrier.

Stanford
Teevens coached at Stanford University from 2002 to 2004. In his three years at the Farm, his teams posted a 10–23 record,  beat BYU twice and San Jose State three times. However, Stanford failed to improve much during his tenure. Teevens went winless against rivals USC, Cal, and Notre Dame, and never posted a win against a team that finished the season with a winning record.  Teevens was fired on November 29, 2004.  The Associated Press noted that Teevens was "respected for his class and loyalty" and that he even appeared at the official announcement of his firing.

Return to Dartmouth
Teevens was re-hired as Dartmouth's head coach on January 5, 2005, and in the 2005 season, the Big Green posted a 2–8 record. The 2008 team went 0-10, the first winless season in Dartmouth history. As of the end of 2009, Teevens had an overall record of 35–63–2 as the head coach at Dartmouth. However, in the 2010 season, Dartmouth seemed to turn the corner under Teevens, posting a 6–4 record, its best record in 13 years. In the 2014 season the team was 6-1 in the Ivy League, losing only to Harvard, behind whom it finished in second place. 

Teevens has won five Ivy League titles with Dartmouth, second most in team history next to Bob Blackman, who won seven with Dartmouth.

Personal life
Teevens and his wife, Kirsten, have two children: Lindsay, who graduated from the University of Florida in 2008, and Eugene IV, who attended Coastal Carolina University.

Head coaching record

References

External links
 Dartmouth profile

1956 births
Living people
American football quarterbacks
Boston University Terriers football coaches
Dartmouth Big Green football coaches
Dartmouth Big Green football players
Dartmouth Big Green men's ice hockey players
DePauw Tigers football coaches
Florida Gators football coaches
Illinois Fighting Illini football coaches
Maine Black Bears football coaches
Stanford Cardinal football coaches
Tulane Green Wave football coaches
Deerfield Academy alumni
People from Pembroke, Massachusetts
Sportspeople from Plymouth County, Massachusetts
Coaches of American football from Massachusetts
Players of American football from Massachusetts